Lola Colt (also known as Black Tigress and Lola Baby) is a 1967 Spaghetti Western film directed by Siro Marcellini.

Reception
One writer described as "a very average Western filled with all the predictable clichés of the genre".

Cast 
 Lola Falana: Lola Gate
 Peter Martell: Rod  
 Germán Cobos: Larry / El Diablo 
 Tom Felleghy: Don Rodriguez 
 Evar Maran: Don Pedro 
 Erna Schürer: Rose Rodriguez 
 Dada Gallotti: Virginia

References

External links

1967 films
1967 Western (genre) films
Spaghetti Western films
Films directed by Siro Marcellini
Girls with guns films
1960s Italian films